The Grohmann Museum, at the Milwaukee School of Engineering, houses an art collection dedicated to the evolution of human work. The museum opened on October 27, 2007 and is located at 1000 N. Broadway, Milwaukee, Wisconsin, United States. 
It is next to the German-English Academy Building.

Overview 
The museum has three floors of galleries where a core collection and  feature exhibitions are displayed. The museum also has a rooftop sculpture garden, a vending cafe, and a museum store.

It is named in honor of Eckhart Grohmann, an MSOE regent, Milwaukee businessman, and avid art collector, who donated the "Man at Work" collection to MSOE in 2001 and subsequently the funds to purchase, renovate, and operate the museum that bears his name. The collection displayed at the rooftop was sculpted and cast in bronze by German-Filipino sculptor Franz Herbich.

German artist Hans Dieter Tylle created stained glass, a mosaic atrium floor, a ceiling mural, and a rooftop mural for the museum.

The collection
The Grohmann Museum Collection contains over 1500 European and American paintings, sculptures and works on paper that depict various forms of work. Captured on canvas and paper or cast in bronze, the works reflect a variety of artistic styles and subjects that document the evolution of organized work, from manpower and horsepower to water, steam and electric power. The collection spans over 400 years of history (17-21st centuries).

Earlier paintings depict men and women working on the farm or at home. Later images show tradespeople engaged in their work, such as blacksmiths, chemists, cobblers, cork makers, glass blowers, or taxidermists. The most recent works are images of machines and men embodying the paradoxes of industrialism of the mid-18th century to post-World War II. These works, often commissioned by the factory's owner, are exterior views of steel mills and foundries surrounded by trains and tracks or dark factory interiors where glowing molten metal is juxtaposed with factory workers and managers.

Most of the works in the Grohmann Museum collection are by German and Dutch artists, although others were created by American, Austrian, Belgian, Bohemian, Danish, Dutch, English, Hungarian, Flemish, French and Spanish artists

Artists include Flemish painter Marten van Valckenborch (1535–1612); Dutch artists Pieter Brueghel the Younger(1564–1638) and Jan Josefsz van Goyen (1596–1656); German painters Carl Spitzweg (1808–1885), Ludwig Knaus (1829–1910), Max Liebermann (1847–1935) and Erich Mercker (1891–1973); American painters J. G. Brown (1831–1913) and F. A. Bridgman (1847–1928); and French painter Julien Dupré (1851–1910).

Gallery

Exhibitions
The inaugural special exhibition Physicians, Quacks, and Alchemists, showed 17th century medical paintings and ran from October 27, 2007 to April 14, 2008, followed by:

 Stone  April 18, 2008 - July 14, 2008
 A Focus on Figures  July 25, 2008 - October 4, 2008
 American Steel: Works from the Collection of Tom and Lorie Annarella  October 17, 2008 - January 4, 2009
 Cradle of Industry: Works from the Rhineland Industrial Museum  January 16 - April 5, 2009
 Wisconsin at Work: Thorsten Lindberg Paintings and Drawings from the MCHS Collection  April 17 - August 14, 2009
 The Bookworm by Carl Spitzweg (1808-1885)  May 15 - October 4, 2009
 Midwest Murals: Joe Jones and J.B. Turnbull from the Haggerty Museum of Art, Marquette University  September 4 - December 6, 2009
 Foundry Work: A View of the Industry, The Photographs of Michael Schultz  January 15 – April 5, 2010
 Working Wisconsin: Selections from the Museum of Wisconsin Art  April 16 – August 20, 2010
 Wonders of Work and Labor: The Steidle Collection of American Industrial Art, Penn State University  September 18, 2010 - January 3, 2011
 Lake Boats: The Photography of Jim Brozek and Christopher Winters  January 14 - April 3, 2011
 Milwaukee Mills: A Visual History  April 15 – August 21, 2011
 Requiem for Steam: The Railroad Photographs of David Plowden  September 23 – December 11, 2011
 Working Legacies: The Death and (After)Life of Post-Industrial Milwaukee  December 16, 2011 - February 6, 2012
 H. D. Tylle: Touring Germany and Working in Wisconsin  February 17 - April 22, 2012
 Great Lakers: Selections from the Great Lakes Marine Collection of the Milwaukee Public Library  May 11 - August 6, 2012
 Carl Spitzweg: The Poor Poet and Other Characters  August 20 - December 30, 2012
 MSOE at Work: Selections from the Campus Archives  September 7 - December 17, 2012
 Bridges: The Spans of North America - Photographs by David Plowden  January 18 - April 28, 2013
 Born of Fire: Scenes of Industry from the Westmoreland Museum of American Art  May 24 - August 18, 2013
 A Working Ranch by Jim Brozek  September 6 - December 13, 2013
 Trains that Passed in the Night: Railroad Photographs of O Winston Link  January 17 - April 27, 2014
 Art Shay: Working  May 16 - August 17, 2014
 Erich Mercker: Painter of Industry  September 5 - December 14, 2014
 The Art of the Milwaukee Road  January 16 - April 26, 2015
 Carl Spitzweg in Milwaukee  April 9 - September 13, 2015
 H.D. Tylle: Studies  April 17 - June 28, 2015
 Metal for Mettle: Historic Commemorative Medals Honoring Labor and Achievement  May 15 - August 23, 2015
 Forge Work: New Photography by Michael Schultz  September 4 - December 13, 2015
 Art of the North Shore Line  January 22 - April 24, 2016
 Milwaukee's Industrial Landscapes: Paintings by Michael Newhall  May 27 - August 21, 2016
 On the Job: Photography by Jim Seder  September 9 - December 11, 2016
 STEEL: The Cycle of Industry by David Plowden  January 20 - April 30, 2017
 Artists at Work: The Cedarburg Artists Guild  May 19 - August 20, 2017
 Masterworks from the Grohmann Museum - Celebrating 10 Years  September 8 - December 29, 2017
 The Art and Mechanics of Animation  January 19 - April 29, 2018
 Wallace W. Abbey: A Life in Railroad Photography  May 11 - August 19, 2018
 David Plowden's Portraits of Work  September 7 - December 30, 2018
 Growing Place: A Visual Study of Urban Farming  January 18 - April 28, 2019
 Roll Up Your Sleeves  May 17 - August 18, 2019
 The Magnificent Machines of Milwaukee  September 6, 2019 - January 26, 2020
 IRONBOAT: New Photography by Christopher Winters  January 17 - August 7, 2020
 TWO EDMUNDS: Fitzgerald and Lewandowski—Their Mark on Milwaukee September 10 - December 29, 2020
 Electric Steel: Recent Photographs by Michael Schultz January 15 - April 25, 2021
 artWORK by the League of Milwaukee Artists May 21 - August 22, 2021
 The Railroad and the Art of Place: Photographs by David Kahler September 10 - December 19, 2021
 Robert O. Lahmann: Working in Wisconsin January 21 - April 24, 2022
 Familias Unidas: Tribute to the Migrant Farm Worker Labor Movement in Wisconsin, 1960s-70 April 22 - August 21, 2022
 A Time of Toil and Triumph: Selections from the Shogren-Meyer Collection of American Art September 9, 2022 - February 26, 2023

References

External links

Virtual tour of the Grohmann Museum provided by Google Arts & Culture

Art museums established in 2007
Museums in Milwaukee
Art museums and galleries in Wisconsin
University museums in Wisconsin
2007 establishments in Wisconsin
Milwaukee School of Engineering